The Grand Review of the Armies was a military procession and celebration in the national capital city of Washington, D.C., on May 23–24, 1865, following the Union victory in the American Civil War (1861–1865). Elements of the Union Army in the United States Army paraded through the streets of the capital to receive accolades from the crowds and reviewing politicians, officials, and prominent citizens, including United States President Andrew Johnson, a month after the assassination of United States President Abraham Lincoln.

History
On May 10, United States President Andrew Johnson had declared that the rebellion and armed resistance was virtually at an end, and had made plans with government authorities for a formal review to honor the troops. One of his side goals was to change the mood of the capital, which was still in mourning following the assassination of United States President Abraham Lincoln a month before at Ford's Theater. Three of the leading Federal armies were close enough to participate in the procession. The Army of the Tennessee arrived via train. The Army of Georgia, also under the command of William T. Sherman, had just completed its Carolinas Campaign and had accepted the surrender of the largest remaining Confederate army, that of Joseph E. Johnston. It arrived from North Carolina in mid-May and camped around the capital city in various locations, across the Potomac River from the Army of the Potomac, fresh off its victories over Robert E. Lee in Virginia. It had arrived in Washington on May 12. Officers in the three armies who had not seen each other for some time (in some cases since before the war) communed and renewed acquaintances, while at times, the common infantrymen engaged in verbal sparring (and sometimes fisticuffs) in the town's taverns and bars over which army was superior. Sherman, concerned that his Westerners would not present as polished an image as the eastern army, drilled his forces and insisted that uniforms be cleaned, buttons and brass shined, and that bayonets glistened.

At 9:00 a.m. on a bright sunny May 23, a signal gun fired a single shot and Maj. Gen. George Gordon Meade, the victor of Gettysburg, led the estimated 80,000 men of Army of the Potomac down the streets of Washington from Capitol Hill down Pennsylvania Avenue past crowds that numbered into the thousands. The infantry marched with 12 men across the road, followed by the divisional and corps artillery, then an array of cavalry regiments that stretched for another seven miles. The mood was one of gaiety and celebration, and the crowds and soldiers frequently engaged in singing patriotic songs as the procession of victorious soldiers snaked its way towards the reviewing stand in front of the White House, where United States President Andrew Johnson, Commanding General Ulysses S. Grant, senior military leaders, the Cabinet, and leading government officials awaited. At the head of his troops, Meade dismounted when he arrived at the reviewing stand and joined the dignitaries to salute his men, who passed for over six hours.

On the following day at 10:00 a.m., Sherman led the 65,000 men of the Army of the Tennessee and the Army of Georgia, with an uncharacteristic semblance of military precision, past the admiring celebrities, most of whom had never seen him before. For six hours under bright sunshine, the men who had marched through Georgia and those who had defeated John Bell Hood's army in Tennessee now paraded in front of joyous throngs lining the sidewalks. People peered from windows and rooftops for their first glimpse of this western army. Unlike Meade's army, which had more military precision, Sherman's Georgia force was trailed by a vast crowd of people who had accompanied the army up from Savannah—freed blacks, laborers, adventurers, scavengers, etc. At the very end was a vast herd of cattle and other livestock that had been taken from Carolina farms.

Within a week after the celebrations, the two armies were disbanded and many of the volunteer regiments and batteries were sent home to be mustered out of the army.

Although there would be further minor guerrilla actions in the south, particularly with respect to armed criminal factions, such as the James-Younger Gang and racial violence in the South (including the rise of the Ku Klux Klan), military conflict on land between the North and the South had ended.  The disbandment of the Union armies and the return home of fathers, brothers, and sons signaled to the population at large that they could begin their return to a normal life and that the end had finally come for the American Civil War.

Given the fact that the Civil War provided the origins for the Memorial Day celebrations held all over the United States, today, the current National Memorial Day Parade of the American Veterans Center marches through parts of the historic parade route used during the two days of parades held in 1865.

See also

 Civil War Defenses of Washington
 Washington, D.C., in the American Civil War
 Civil War

References

External links

 Grand Review of the Armies (May, 1865) - photos and brief story
 CivilWarHome.com
 The Grand Review of the Armies 1865 - Photographs of the Grand Review of the Armies in chronological order.

Union Army
Washington, D.C., in the American Civil War
Victory parades
Parades in the United States
1865 in the American Civil War
1865 in military history
1865 in Washington, D.C.
May 1865 events
Military parades in the United States